Petrey is a surname. Notable people with the surname include:

Susan C. Petrey (1945–1980), American writer 
Taylor G. Petrey (born 1976), American scholar and editor

See also 
 Petree
 Petri
 Petry